Anthracoceratites is an extinct genus of the Dimorphoceratidae family. They are an extinct group of ammonoid, which are shelled cephalopods related to squids, belemnites, octopuses, and cuttlefish, and more distantly to the nautiloids.

References

 The Paleobiology Database accessed on 10/01/07

Goniatitida genera
Dimorphoceratidae
Fossils of Uzbekistan
Fossils of Russia